Blue Canadian Rockies is a 1952 American western film directed by George Archainbaud and starring Gene Autry. In the film Autry sang the song "Blue Canadian Rockies", written by Cindy Walker. Autry had also sung the song in 1951's Gene Autry and The Mounties.

Plot

Cast
 Gene Autry
 Gail Davis

References

External links

1952 films
1950s English-language films
1952 Western (genre) films
Films directed by George Archainbaud
Columbia Pictures films
American Western (genre) films
Films set in Canada
American black-and-white films
1950s American films